Bala is a 2002 Indian Tamil-language action film written and directed by Deepak, starring Shaam as the titular character along with Meera Jasmine. Rajan P. Dev, Raghuvaran, Thilakan, and Santhoshi play supporting roles. The music was composed by Yuvan Shankar Raja with cinematography by Priyan and editing by V. T. Vijayan. The film was released on 13 December 2002.

Plot
Bala (Shaam) is the favourite hitman of gangster Pasupathi (Rajan P. Dev). When Bala is not zooming around in jeeps with a wild-looking gang, parading down lanes with the same gang faithfully following a step behind him, or knocking down one person or another, he's successfully wooing Aarthi (Meera Jasmine), the girl he has fallen for at first sight. Aarthi is the daughter of Jeyamani (Raghuvaran), a rival gangster. Ailing don Paranthaman (Thilakan), the mentor of the two rivals, seeing his protégés at each other's throats, brings a compromise by suggesting that Aarthi will be married to Pasupathi's wayward son. Bala naturally becomes a pariah in both camps, till it's all's well that ends well.

Cast

 Shaam as Bala
 Meera Jasmine as Aarthi
 Raghuvaran as Jayamani
 Nagesh as Varadhan
 Thilakan as Paranthaman
 Karunas as Kutty
 Rajan P. Dev as Pasupathi
 Thalaivasal Vijay as Pasupathi's enemy
 Mahanadhi Shankar as Pasupathi's gang member
 Kalairani as Bala's blind mother
 Sabitha Anand as Jayamani's second wife
 Meera Krishnan as Aarthi's mother
 Gouthami as Pasupathi's wife
 Rajasekar as Bala's father
 Singamuthu as a marriage broker
 Kamalesh as Pasupathy's son
 Santhoshi as Purnima
 Master Udayaraj as Jayamani's son
 Baby Srividya as Jayamani's daughter
 Scissor Manohar as the bus conductor
 Muthukaalai as a bus passenger
 Pawan as Jayamani's henchman (uncredited)

Production
Deepak, who worked as an assistant director to Gandhi Krishna (of Engineer) and as an editor made his directorial debut with this film. Yuvan Shankar Raja was signed to compose the music for the film. Vidya Balan, the original choice for lead actress, was replaced by Meera Jasmine in the film. Shaam departed from his romantic hero role and portrayed an action oriented role in the film.

Some scenes were shot on a boat about fifteen kilometers from the harbour, in Chennai whereas at the Vauhini Studios, Chennai, a lavish set was erected where Shaam and Meera Jasmine danced to the beat of a song.

Soundtrack

The soundtrack, featuring 5 songs, was composed by Yuvan Shankar Raja and released on 20 October 2002. Lyrics were penned by Arivumathi, Kabilan, Pa. Vijay and Pazhani Bharathi. The song "Bailamo Bailamo" was originally composed for the Srikanth-starrer April Maadhathil, but eventually used in this film.

Release 
A critic from The Hindu stated that "'Bala'  is another of those typical action flicks that flood the cinema scene today". Malini Mannath of Chennai Online opined that "It's yet again a gangster film, the scenes flowing albeit smoothly, but expectantly through clichéd situations giving one a sense of deja vu throughout". Visual Dasan of Kalki criticised the age old story and called the film "boring" while praised the dialogues, background score, and cinematography.

Despite the failure of Shaam's previous films, this film managed to average business.

References

External links

2002 films
2000s Tamil-language films
Indian action films
Films scored by Yuvan Shankar Raja
2002 action films
2002 directorial debut films